James Roy Horner (August 14, 1953 – June 22, 2015) was an American composer. He was known for the integration of choral and electronic elements, and for his frequent use of motifs associated with Celtic music.

Horner's first film score was in 1979 for The Lady in Red, but he did not establish himself as an eminent film composer until his work on the 1982 film Star Trek II: The Wrath of Khan. His score for James Cameron's Titanic is the best-selling orchestral film soundtrack of all time. He also wrote the score for the highest-grossing film of all time, Cameron's Avatar. Horner also scored other notable films including Star Trek III: The Search for Spock (1984), The Name of the Rose (1986), Aliens (1986), Willow (1988), Field of Dreams (1989), Honey, I Shrunk the Kids (1989), The Rocketeer (1991), Braveheart (1995), The Mask of Zorro (1998), Deep Impact (1998), A Beautiful Mind (2001) and The Amazing Spider-Man (2012).

Horner collaborated on multiple projects with directors including Don Bluth, James Cameron, Jean-Jacques Annaud, Joe Johnston, Walter Hill, Ron Howard, Phil Nibbelink and Simon Wells; producers including George Lucas, David Kirschner, Jon Landau, Brian Grazer and Steven Spielberg; and songwriters including Will Jennings, Barry Mann and Cynthia Weil. He won two Academy Awards, six Grammy Awards, two Golden Globes, three Satellite Awards, three Saturn Awards, and was nominated for three BAFTA Awards.

Horner, who was an avid pilot, died at the age of 61 in a single-fatality crash while flying his Short Tucano turboprop aircraft.

Early life
Horner was born on August 14, 1953, in Los Angeles, California, to Jewish  immigrant parents.

His father, Harry Horner, was born in Holice, Bohemia, then a part of Austria-Hungary. He emigrated to the United States in 1935 and worked as a set designer and art director. His mother, Joan Ruth (née Frankel), was born to a Canadian family. His brother Christopher is a writer and documentary filmmaker.

Horner started playing piano at the age of five. He also played violin. He spent his early years in London, where he attended the Royal College of Music, where he studied with György Ligeti. He returned to America, where he attended Verde Valley School in Sedona, Arizona, and later received his bachelor's degree in music from the University of Southern California. After earning a master's degree, he started work on his doctorate at the University of California, Los Angeles (UCLA), where he studied with Paul Reale, among others. After several scoring assignments with the American Film Institute in the 1970s, he finished teaching a course in music theory at UCLA, then turned to film scoring. Horner was also an avid pilot and owned several small airplanes.

Career
Horner's first credits as a feature-film composer were for B-movie director and producer Roger Corman. 1979's The Lady in Red, was followed by 1980's Humanoids from the Deep and Battle Beyond the Stars. As his work gained notice in Hollywood, Horner was invited to take on larger projects.

Horner's big break came in 1982 when he was asked to score Star Trek II: The Wrath of Khan. It established him as an A-list Hollywood composer. Director Nicholas Meyer quipped that Horner was hired because the studio could no longer afford the first Trek movie's composer, Jerry Goldsmith; but that by the time Meyer returned to the franchise with Star Trek VI: The Undiscovered Country, the studio could not afford Horner either.

Horner continued writing high-profile film scores in the 1980s, including 48 Hrs. (1982), Krull (1983), Star Trek III: The Search for Spock (1984), Commando (1985), Cocoon (1985), Aliens (1986), Captain EO (1986), *batteries not included (1987), Willow (1988), Glory and Field of Dreams (both 1989). Cocoon was the first of his many collaborations with director Ron Howard.

In 1987, Horner's original score for Aliens brought him his first Academy Award nomination. "Somewhere Out There," which he co-composed and co-wrote with Barry Mann and Cynthia Weil for An American Tail, was also nominated that year for Best Original Song.

Throughout the 1980s, 1990s and 2000s, Horner wrote orchestral scores for family films (particularly those produced by Steven Spielberg's Amblin Entertainment), with credits for An American Tail (1986); The Land Before Time (1988); The Rocketeer, Once Around and An American Tail: Fievel Goes West (1991); Once Upon a Forest and We're Back! A Dinosaur's Story (1993); The Pagemaster (1994); Casper, Jumanji and Balto (1995); Mighty Joe Young (1998); and How the Grinch Stole Christmas (2000).

Horner scored six films in 1995, including his commercially successful and critically acclaimed works for Braveheart and Apollo 13, both of which received Academy Award nominations.

Horner's biggest critical and financial success came in 1997 with his score for James Cameron's Titanic. At the 70th Academy Awards, Horner received the Oscar for Best Original Dramatic Score, and shared the Oscar for Best Original Song with co-writer Will Jennings for "My Heart Will Go On". The film's score and song also won three Grammy Awards and two Golden Globe Awards. (Ten years earlier, Horner had vowed never to work with Cameron again, referring to the highly stressful scoring sessions for Aliens as "a nightmare.")

After Titanic, Horner continued to compose for major productions, including The Perfect Storm, A Beautiful Mind,
Enemy at the Gates, The Mask of Zorro, The Legend of Zorro, House of Sand and Fog and Bicentennial Man. He also worked on smaller projects such as Iris, Radio and Bobby Jones: Stroke of Genius. He received his eighth and ninth Academy Award nominations for A Beautiful Mind (2001) and House of Sand and Fog (2003), but lost on both occasions to composer Howard Shore.

Horner composed the 2006–2011 theme for the CBS Evening News, which was introduced during the debut of anchor Katie Couric on September 5, 2006. He wrote various treatments of the theme, explaining, "One night the show might begin with the Iranians obtaining a nuclear device, and another it might be something about a flower show... The tone needs to match the news."

Horner collaborated again with James Cameron on his 2009 film Avatar, which became the highest-grossing film of all time, surpassing Cameron's own Titanic. Horner worked exclusively on Avatar for over two years. He said, "Avatar has been the most difficult film I have worked on, and the biggest job I have undertaken... I work from four in the morning to about ten at night, and that's been my way of life since March. That's the world I'm in now, and it makes you feel estranged from everything. I'll have to recover from that and get my head out of [it]."

Avatar brought Horner his tenth Academy Award nomination, as well as nominations for the Golden Globe Award, British Academy Film Award and Grammy Award, all of which he lost to Michael Giacchino for Up.

After Avatar, Horner wrote the score for the 2010 version of The Karate Kid, replacing Atli Örvarsson. In 2011, he scored Cristiada (also known as For Greater Glory), which was released a year later; and Black Gold. In 2012 he scored The Amazing Spider-Man, starring Andrew Garfield. In an interview on his website, Horner revealed that he didn't return to compose the score for the sequel because he didn't like how the movie resulted in comparison to the first movie, calling it "dreadful." He was replaced by Hans Zimmer. James Horner's theme for The Amazing Spider-Man would later be incorporated into the film Spider-Man: No Way Home, composed by Michael Giacchino.

In early 2015, after a three-year hiatus, Horner wrote the music for the adventure film Wolf Totem, his fourth collaboration with director Jean-Jacques Annaud.

At the time of his death, Horner had scored two films yet to be released:

In July 2015, a month after his death, it was discovered Horner had also written the score for the 2016 remake of The Magnificent Seven, planning it as a surprise.

Horner's scores are also heard in trailers for other films. The climax of Bishop's Countdown, from his score for Aliens, ranks as the 5th most commonly used soundtrack cue in trailers.

Horner also wrote the theme music for the Horsemen P-51 Aerobatic Team, and appears in "The Horsemen Cometh", a documentary about the team and the P-51 Mustang fighter plane. The theme is heard at the team's airshow performances.

Orchestral work
Pas de Deux, a double concerto for violin, cello and Orchestra with the Royal Liverpool Philharmonic Orchestra, was premiered on November 12, 2014, by Mari and Håkon Samuelsen, with the orchestra conducted by Vasily Petrenko. Horner also composed Collage, a concerto for four horns, premiered on March 27, 2015, at London's Royal Festival Hall by the London Philharmonic Orchestra conducted by Jaime Martín, with soloists David Pyatt, John Ryan, James Thatcher and Richard Watkins. Two early works, Spectral Shimmers (1978) and A Forest Passage (2000), are to be performed and recorded for the first time in 2021.

Musical "borrowing" 
Horner was criticized more than once for reusing passages from his earlier compositions, and for featuring brief excerpts and reworked themes from classical composers. For example, his scores from Star Trek II: The Wrath of Khan and Star Trek III: The Search for Spock include excerpts from Prokofiev's Alexander Nevsky and Romeo and Juliet; The action ostinato from Aliens is originally from Wolfen and the film's main title is almost identical to Aram Khachaturian's Gayane Ballet Suite (Adagio) (already used in an outer space context in 2001: A Space Odyssey) - Horner was to use it again within the score of Patriot Games; the heroic theme from Willow is based on that of Robert Schumann's Rhenish Symphony; Field of Dreams includes cues from the "Saturday Night Waltz" portion of Aaron Copland's ballet Rodeo and Copland's score from Our Town; Horner blended part of an early theme from the third movement of Shostakovich's Symphony no. 5 into an action scene in Patriot Games, and the climactic battle scene in Glory includes excerpts from Wagner and Orff. Some critics felt these propensities made Horner's compositions inauthentic or unoriginal. In a 1997 issue of Film Score Monthly, an editorial review of Titanic said Horner was "skilled in the adaptation of existing music into films with just enough variation to avoid legal troubles".

Several critics have noted stark similarities between Braveheart's "Main Theme" and an earlier theme song, Kaoru Wada's "Pai Longing" from the 1991 Japanese anime series 3×3 Eyes.

On at least one occasion, Horner's musical "borrowing" almost led to litigation. Horner's main title for Honey, I Shrunk the Kids (1989) incorporates cues from the score by Nino Rota from Federico Fellini's film Amarcord (1973) and Raymond Scott's piece "Powerhouse B" (1937), the latter often referenced in Carl Stalling's Warner Bros. cartoon scores. Scott's piece was used without payment or credit, leading his estate to threaten legal action against Disney. Disney paid an undisclosed sum in an out-of-court settlement and changed the film's cue sheets to credit Scott.

Death

Horner died on June 22, 2015, when his turboprop aircraft, a Short Tucano with registration number N206PZ, crashed into the Los Padres National Forest near Ventucopa, California. Horner was the only occupant of the aircraft when it took off after fueling at Camarillo Airport. Three days later, on June 25, the Ventura County Medical Examiner's Office ruled the crash an accident. He was survived by his wife, Sara Elizabeth Horner (née Nelson), and two daughters.

Post-accident investigation by the National Transportation Safety Board (NTSB) revealed that the leading cause of the accident was Horner's inability to maintain clearance from terrain during low-level airwork. During the flight, Horner contacted the Southern California Air Route Traffic Control Center, from whom he received advisories while flying over the Chumash Wilderness area.

In addition to Horner's failing to maintain clearance, the NTSB determined there were other key factors that led to the accident. Foremost among these was Horner's use of prescription medications for pain relief and headaches. Toxicology testing found butalbital, codeine, and ethanol in Horner's body (although the ethanol may have been produced by microbial activity after his death).

Tributes
Contemporaries and collaborators around the world paid their respects to Horner, including composers Hans Zimmer, John Williams, Paul Williams and Alan Menken, and directors Ron Howard and James Cameron. Horner was reported to have been committed to the Avatar franchise; Cameron said he and Horner "were looking forward to our next gig." Horner's assistant, Sylvia Patrycja, wrote on her Facebook page, "We have lost an amazing person with a huge heart and unbelievable talent [who] died doing what he loved." Many celebrities, including Russell Crowe, Diane Warren and Celine Dion, also gave their condolences. Dion, who sang "My Heart Will Go On", one of Horner's most popular compositions, which is considered Dion's signature song, wrote on her website that she and husband René Angélil were "shaken by the tragic death" of their friend and "will always remember his kindness and great talent that changed [her] career." Leona Lewis, who recorded Horner's "I See You" for Avatar, said working with him "was one of the biggest moments of my life." The final films which he composed the score for, Southpaw, The 33, and The Magnificent Seven, were all dedicated to his memory, as was the film Hacksaw Ridge. Avatar: The Way of Water, which Horner was set to work on before he died, was also dedicated to his memory, as well as actor Bill Paxton who died in 2017 and previously worked with Horner and Cameron on Aliens and Titanic.

Dedicated movies 

 The World of James Horner - Hollywood in Vienna 2013, directed by Sandra Tomek (2013)

Awards and nominations
Horner won two Academy Awards, for Best Original Dramatic Score (Titanic) and Best Original Song ("My Heart Will Go On") in 1998, and was nominated for an additional eight Oscars. He also won two Golden Globe Awards, three Satellite Awards, three Saturn Awards, six Grammys, and was nominated for three British Academy Film Awards.

In October 2013, Horner received the Max Steiner Award at the Hollywood in Vienna Gala, an award given for extraordinary achievement in the field of film music.

AFI
In 2005, the American Film Institute unveiled their list of the top twenty-five American film scores. Five of Horner's scores were among 250 nominees, making him the most nominated composer to not make the top twenty-five.

Field of Dreams (1989)
Glory (1989)
Apollo 13 (1995)
Braveheart (1995)
Titanic (1997)

List of accolades

Grammy Awards
 1988: An American Tail – Best Album of Original Instrumental Background Score Written for a Motion Picture or Television
 1988: "Somewhere Out There" (from: An American Tail, Winner) – Song of The Year
 1988: "Somewhere Out There" (from: An American Tail, Winner) – Best Song Written specifically For a Motion Picture or Television
 1990: Field of Dreams – Best Album of Original Instrumental Background Score Written for a Motion Picture or Television
 1991: Glory (Winner) – Best Instrumental Composition Written for a Motion Picture or for Television
 1996: "Whatever You Imagine" (from: The Pagemaster) – Best Song Written specifically For a Motion Picture or Television
 1999: "My Heart Will Go On" (from: Titanic, Winner) – Record of The Year
 1999: "My Heart Will Go On" (from: Titanic, Winner) – Song of The Year
 1999: "My Heart Will Go On" (from: Titanic, Winner) – Best Song Written For A Motion Picture or for Television
 2003: A Beautiful Mind – Best Score Soundtrack Album for Motion Picture, Television or Other Visual Media
 2011: Avatar – Best Score Soundtrack Album for Motion Picture, Television or Other Visual Media
 2011: "I See You" (from: Avatar) – Best Song Written For A Motion Picture, Television or Other Visual Media

List of scores

References

External links

 
 James Horner at Sony Classical
 James Horner at Film Music
 James Horner interview (1983) from CinemaScore magazine

1953 births
2015 deaths
20th-century American composers
20th-century American conductors (music)
20th-century American Jews
20th-century American male musicians
20th-century classical composers
21st-century American composers
21st-century American conductors (music)
21st-century American Jews
21st-century American male musicians
21st-century classical composers
Accidental deaths in California
Alumni of the Royal College of Music
American classical composers
American film score composers
American male classical composers
American male conductors (music)
American male film score composers
American people of Austrian-Jewish descent
American people of Canadian descent
American people of Czech-Jewish descent
American people of Hungarian-Jewish descent
American television composers
Animated film score composers
Aviators killed in aviation accidents or incidents in the United States
Best Original Music Score Academy Award winners
Best Original Song Academy Award-winning songwriters
Classical musicians from California
Decca Records artists
Golden Globe Award-winning musicians
Grammy Award winners
Jewish American classical composers
Jewish American film score composers
Jewish American television composers
La-La Land Records artists
Male television composers
MCA Records artists
Musicians from Los Angeles
Sony Classical Records artists
USC Thornton School of Music alumni
UCLA School of the Arts and Architecture alumni
Varèse Sarabande Records artists
Victims of aviation accidents or incidents in 2015
DreamWorks Animation people
Sony Pictures Animation people